The Active-class cruisers were a trio of scout cruisers built for the Royal Navy shortly before the First World War. They went out on a patrol on the first day of the war and Amphion and her destroyers encountered and sank a German minelayer. On the voyage home, the cruiser struck a mine laid by the German ship and sank. She was the first ship of the Royal Navy to be sunk in the war.

Fearless went out on the same patrol, but encountered nothing. She participated in the Battle of Heligoland Bight and the Cuxhaven Raid later that year. The ship and her destroyers were transferred to the Grand Fleet in early 1915. , on the other hand, remained with the Grand Fleet and both ships played minor roles in the Battle of Jutland the following year. After the battle, Fearless was converted into a submarine depot ship and rejoined the Grand Fleet in 1917 as the leader of a submarine flotilla. A year later, she accidentally rammed and sank one submarine as part of an incident that sardonically came to be known as the Battle of May Island.

Shortly after Jutland, Active again became a destroyer leader and escorted the main body of the Grand Fleet during the action of 19 August 1916. By the end of the year, the ship was assigned to the Dover Patrol and was present during two battles with German destroyers, but was not engaged in either. She was transferred to the Mediterranean Fleet in 1918 and was based in Gibraltar for the rest of the war. The sister ships were both sold for scrap in 1920–21.

Design and description
They were the last class of scout cruisers built for the Royal Navy as they were too slow to lead destroyers in battle or to defend the fleet against enemy destroyer attacks. The Active class was a slightly improved version of the previous  scouts, with the main visible difference being the new 'plough' bow changed to improve their seakeeping abilities. Two of the three were ordered under the 1910–1911 Naval Programme and the last in the following naval programme.

They were powered by two sets of Parsons steam turbines, each driving two shafts. Their crew consisted of 293 officers and ratings.

The main armament of the Active class consisted of ten breech-loading (BL) four-inch Mk VII guns. The forward pair of guns were mounted side by side on a platform on the forecastle, six were amidships, three on each broadside, and the two remaining guns were on the centreline of the quarterdeck, one ahead of the other. Their secondary armament was four quick-firing (QF) three-pounder  Vickers Mk I guns and two submerged 18-inch (450 mm) torpedo tubes. In 1918, two 4-inch guns were removed from Active and Fearless. A QF three-inch 20 cwt anti-aircraft gun was added to Active in 1916; Fearless receiving her own two years later.

As scout cruisers, the ships were only lightly protected to maximise their speed. Their conning tower was protected by four inches of armour.

Ships

Service
All three ships were initially assigned to various squadrons in the First Fleet and then became flotilla leaders in mid-1914. When the war began in August, Amphion and Fearless and their flotillas (the 3rd and 1st Destroyer Flotillas (DF), respectively) were part of the Harwich Force. The morning after Britain joined the war, the force sortied on a patrol to the Dutch coast. The 3rd DF encountered and sank a German minelayer, SMS Königin Luise, but not before she had laid many of her mines. While returning home the following morning, Amphion accidentally struck a mine on 6 August off the Thames Estuary and sank with the loss of 132 crewmen killed. She was the first ship of the Royal Navy to be sunk in the First World War. The wreck site is protected and may not be dived upon without permission from the Ministry of Defence.

Fearless and the 1st DF saw nothing during that same patrol. She damaged two German light cruisers during the Battle of Heligoland Bight later in August. The squadron provided close cover for the seaplane carriers of the Harwich Force during the Cuxhaven Raid in late December, but the cruiser was only engaged by several Zeppelins and aircraft without effect. The ship was transferred to the Grand Fleet in early 1915 and played a minor role in the Battle of Jutland the following year.

She was converted into a submarine depot ship shortly afterwards and briefly deployed to Russia later in the year. Fearless later became the leader of the 12th Submarine Flotilla, initially based in Scapa Flow, but later in Rosyth. On 31 January 1918, she accidentally rammed and sank the submarine  at night in poor visibility as part of an incident that sardonically came to be known as the Battle of May Island. The ship was repaired and was sold for scrap in November 1921.

Unlike her sisters, Active with her 2nd Destroyer Flotilla were assigned to the Grand Fleet at the beginning of the war, where their primary task was to protect the fleet from submarines. By the beginning of 1916, the cruiser was relieved of her assignment with the 2nd DF and she was on detached service with the Grand Fleet in January. Active also played a minor role in the Battle of Jutland later in the year. Shortly afterwards, she was briefly assigned as the flotilla leader of the 4th Destroyer Flotilla and escorted the main body of the Grand Fleet during the action of 19 August. By the end of the year, the ship was assigned to the Dover Patrol and was present during two battles with German destroyers, but was not engaged in either. Active was based in Gibraltar from April 1918 as part of the Mediterranean Fleet. The ship was reduced to reserve by 1 February 1919 and was sold for scrap on 21 April 1920.

Notes

Footnotes

Bibliography

External links

 Boadicea class cruisers at DreadnoughtProject.org for more detail on armament

 
Cruiser classes
Ship classes of the Royal Navy